The men's team sabre was one of eight fencing events on the fencing at the 1968 Summer Olympics programme. It was the thirteenth appearance of the event. The competition was held from 20 to 21 October 1968. 56 fencers from 12 nations competed.

Results

Round 1
Ties between teams were broken by individual victories (in parentheses), then by touches received.

Championship rounds

Fifth place semifinal

Rosters

Argentina
 Román Quinos
 Juan Carlos Frecia
 Guillermo Saucedo
 Alberto Lanteri

Cuba
 Manuel Ortiz
 José Narciso Díaz
 Joaquin Tack-Fang
 Félix Delgado

France
 Marcel Parent
 Claude Arabo
 Bernard Vallée
 Serge Panizza
 Jean-Ernest Ramez

Great Britain
 Sandy Leckie
 Rodney Craig
 David Acfield
 Richard Oldcorn

Hungary
 Tibor Pézsa
 Miklós Meszéna
 János Kalmár
 Péter Bakonyi
 Tamás Kovács

Ireland
 Colm O'Brien
 Fionbarr Farrell
 Michael Ryan
 John Bouchier-Hayes

Italy
 Wladimiro Calarese
 Rolando Rigoli
 Pierluigi Chicca
 Michele Maffei
 Cesare Salvadori

Mexico
 William Fajardo
 Gustavo Chapela
 Héctor Abaunza
 Vicente Calderón
 Román Gómez

Poland
 Jerzy Pawłowski
 Józef Nowara
 Franciszek Sobczak
 Zygmunt Kawecki
 Emil Ochyra

Soviet Union
 Umyar Mavlikhanov
 Mark Rakita
 Viktor Sidyak
 Vladimir Nazlymov
 Eduard Vinokurov

United States
 Alex Orban
 Alfonso Morales
 Anthony Keane
 Robert Blum
 Thomas Balla

West Germany
 Percy Borucki
 Walter Köstner
 Paul Wischeidt
 Klaus Allisat
 Volker Duschner

References

Fencing at the 1968 Summer Olympics
Men's events at the 1968 Summer Olympics